Meyer Rosenbaum may refer to any of these three Hasidic rabbis:
 Grand Rabbi Meyer Rosenbaum (I) of Kretchnif, son of Rabbi Mordechai of Nadvorna
 Chief Rabbi Meyer Rosenbaum (II) Chief Rabbi of Cuba, son of Rabbi Issamar of Nadvorna
 See Kretshnif (Hasidic dynasty) for Grand Rabbi Meyer Rosenbaum (III), of Karakas, son of Rabbi Yitzchak Isaac of Zutshka